Robert Gerald Casey (born September 23, 1967) is an American prelate of the Roman Catholic Church.  He has been serving as an auxiliary bishop for the Archdiocese of Chicago since 2018.

Biography

Early life 
Robert Casey was born on September 23, 1967, in Evergreen Park, Illinois.  He is the fourth of five children of Michael Casey, a butcher, and Margaret Casey, a nurse.  When he was a child, his family moved to Alsip, Illinois, where he attended Stony Creek Elementary School and Prairie Junior High School.  Casey then entered Marist High School in Chicago, where he started considering the priesthood.

After graduating from high school, Casey entered Niles College Seminary of Loyola University Chicago, graduating with a degree in English. He also attended University of St. Mary of the Lake, in Mundelein, Illinois.

Priesthood 
On May 21, 1994, Casey was ordained to the priesthood for the Archdiocese of Chicago at Holy Name Cathedral in Chicago by Cardinal Joseph Bernardin.

After his ordination, Casey was assigned as associate pastor of St. Ita Parish in Chicago.  In 1998, he was also appointed associate director of Casa Jesus, a priesthood recruiting program aimed at Hispanic men.  By 1999, Casey was working full time as its director.  In 2003, Casey was assigned as pastor of Our Lady of Tepeyac Parish in Chicago.  He was moved in 2009 to St. Barbara Parish in Brookfield, Illinois, serving there until 2016.  Casey's next assignment was as pastor of St. Bede the Venerable Parish in Chicago.

Auxiliary Bishop of Chicago 
Pope Francis appointed Casey as auxiliary bishop for the Archdiocese of Chicago on July 3, 2018.  On September 17, 2018, Casey was consecrated at Holy Name Cathedral in Chicago by Cardinal Blase Cupich.  After his installation, Casey was assigned as vicar for Vicariate III.  In 2020, he was appointed vicar general for the archdiocese.

See also

 Catholic Church hierarchy
 Catholic Church in the United States
 Historical list of the Catholic bishops of the United States
 List of Catholic bishops of the United States
 Lists of patriarchs, archbishops, and bishops

References

External links
Roman Catholic Archdiocese of Chicago Official Site

Episcopal succession

 

1967 births
Living people
People from Evergreen Park, Illinois
Bishops appointed by Pope Francis
Catholics from Illinois
21st-century Roman Catholic bishops in the United States